Acilius may refer to:

 The family name of any ancient Roman man of the gens Acilia (see for list)
 A genus of diving beetles (see Acilius (genus)), including:
Acilius sulcatus
Acilius duvergeri